Jucuapa is a municipality in the Usulután department of El Salvador.

Sports
The local football club is C.D. Aspirante which plays in the Salvadoran Second Division.

External links
 Website 

Municipalities of the Usulután Department

mijucuapa.com